Choi Min-yong (born June 6, 1977) is a South Korean actor. He is best known for his role in the hit sitcom High Kick!. He was a cast member in the MBC's variety show We Got Married with comedian Jang Do-yeon.

Filmography

Television series

Film

Variety show

Awards and nominations

Notes

References

External links

1977 births
Living people
South Korean male film actors
South Korean male television actors
Male actors from Seoul
20th-century South Korean male actors
21st-century South Korean male actors